Edwin Plimpton Adams (Prague, 23 January 1878 – Princeton, New Jersey, 31 December 1956) was an American physicist known for translating Einstein's lectures. Clinton Joseph Davisson attended his lectures.

Works

 (NB. A significant number of entries of this book were later included in Iosif Moiseevich Ryzhik's integral table Tables of integrals, sums, series and products (Таблицы интегралов, сумм, рядов и произведений) in 1945.)

Further reading

References

External links
 
 
 Mathematical formulae prepared by Edwin P. Adams
Edwin Plimpton Adams Papers, 1900–1945: Finding Aid

1878 births
1956 deaths
19th-century American mathematicians
20th-century American mathematicians
American physicists
Scientists from Prague
People from Princeton, New Jersey
Harvard University alumni
Princeton University faculty
Austro-Hungarian emigrants to the United States